Scottis (Older Scots form of the Modern Scots "Scots" meaning "Scottish") and may refer to:
 Early Scots
 Scotch (disambiguation)
 Goidelic language
 Scots language